Grupo Marsans was a private Spanish consortium mainly dedicated to tour operations. It had operations in Spain, France, Italy, Brazil, Mexico, Venezuela, and Argentina, as well as representations in Latin America. Grupo Marsans was a subsidiary of Autobuses Urbanos del Sur, S.A. It was based in Madrid, Spain.

The consortium was the parent company of Air Comet and charter airline AirPlus, and participated, along with SAS, in the Spanair's owner holding.

History
The company was founded in 1910 by Rafael Almeida and Armando Marsans, from whom it took the name. Grupo Marsans was privatised in 1985, when it was acquired by the Trapsa holding, headed by Gonzalo Pascual and Gerardo Díaz Ferrán; it had previously been part of the Spanish consortium INI.

In December the same year, Grupo Marsans bidded for a small stake in Spanair, then owned by the SAS Group, but withdrew its interest in  arguing that SAS made the bidding public.

Financial difficulties and downfall
According to Spanish newspaper ABC, the downfall of Grupo Marsans was precipitated by mounting financial difficulties arising from the inability of the management to properly handle the airlines that had been gradually incorporated, which eventually led to a €320 million debt the group was unable to afford. In , the Marsans' license for selling air tickets was revoked by the International Air Transport Association; this occurred the same day a Spanish court declared the insolvency of Air Comet, an airline controlled by the group. In June that year, Grupo Marsans was sold to Posibilitum Business for  million (€600 million), with approximately half this amount being debts.

Subsidiaries

Aerolíneas Argentinas

In , 92% of Aerolíneas Argentinas was assigned to Grupo Marsans by the SEPI, which had controlled the Argentine carrier since , with the group committing to acknowledge half the debt of the airline at that time, around  million, and to inject another  million. Along with its domestic subsidiary Austral Líneas Aéreas, Aerolíneas Argentinas was owned by Marsans until both carriers were renationalised in late 2008. In July that year, Marsans agreed to sell the airline back to the Argentine government; a contract was signed to look for a third-party to evaluate the price of the transaction, should the parties involved not come to an agreement, but the government took over the airline after negotiations with Grupo Marsans broke down over the difference for that price (Credit Suisse valued the company at  million for Marsans, whereas an Argentine court said the airline was worth − million) and allegations of mismanagement. According to MercoPress, Grupo Marsans began a steady decline in 2008, when control of the airline was taken over by the Argentine government.

AeBal-Spanair Link
AeBal, Aerolíneas de Baleares was established in 1999 and started operations on 5 July 2000 from Madrid with domestic services and an initial fleet of three Boeing 717 aircraft. It was originally named Aerolíneas Baleares Blue Star, but has operated under the AeBal-Spanair Link name, whilst retaining much of its Spanair pedigree in the livery. It was owned by Grupo Marsans (51%), SAS Group (25%), Spanair (18%) and VITRAC (6%) and had 155 employees (at March 2007). A number of changes in the shareholding structure of the company ended up with SAS Group owning 100% of the company.

Aerolíneas del Sur

Aerolíneas del Sur was later rebranded as Air Comet Chile, and served several destinations within the country, including   Antofagasta, Calama, Concepción, Iquique, Punta Arenas, Puerto Montt and Santiago.

Air Comet

The airline was created in 1996, and served primarily Latin American destinations, including Buenos Aires, Havana, Guayaquil, Lima and Quito. In , all flights were suspended following the ruling of a London court that ordered the impoundment of the carrier's 13-strong fleet. The decision was made over a  million debt with HSH Nordbank for the lease of aircraft, some of them property of an Irish firm. The airline had its operator's certificate cancelled by the Spanish Development Ministry a day after operations were disrupted. At the time of closure, the company owed its employees some €7 million in wages, and they had not been paid for six months.

Spanair

Teinver, which was in turn owned by Marsans, held a 51% controlling stake in the airline until 2001, when SAS boosted its participation in the carrier to 75%.

References

External links

Travel and holiday companies of Spain
Spanish companies disestablished in 2010
Defunct companies of Spain